Lithotripsy is a non-invasive procedure involving the physical destruction of hardened masses like kidney stones, bezoars or gallstones. The term is derived from the Greek words meaning "breaking (or pulverizing) stones" (litho- + τρίψω [tripso]).

Uses 
Lithotripsy is a non-invasive procedure used to break up hardened masses like kidney stones, bezoars or gallstones.

Contraindications 
"Commonly cited absolute contraindications to SWL include pregnancy, coagulopathy or use of platelet aggregation inhibitors, aortic aneurysms, severe untreated hypertension, and untreated urinary tract infections."

Techniques
 Extracorporeal shock wave therapy
 Intracorporeal (endoscopic lithotripsy): 
 Laser lithotripsy : effective for larger stones (> 2 cm) with good stone-free and complication rates.
 Electrohydraulic lithotripsy
 Mechanical lithotripsy
 Ultrasonic lithotripsy : safer for small stones (<10 mm)

History
Surgery was the only method to remove stones too large to pass until French surgeon and urologist Jean Civiale in 1832 invented a surgical instrument (the lithotrite) to crush stones inside the bladder without having to open the abdomen. To remove a calculus, Civiale inserted his instrument through the urethra and bored holes in the stone. Afterwards, he crushed it with the same instrument and aspirated the resulting fragments or let them flow normally with urine.

Lithotripsy replaced using lithotrites as the most common treatment beginning in the mid 1980s.  In extracorporeal shock wave lithotripsy (ESWL), external shockwaves are focused at the stone to pulverize it. Ureteroscopic methods use a rigid or flexible scope to reach the stone and direct mechanical or light energy at it. Endoscopy can use lasers as well as other modes of energy delivery: ultrasound or electrohydraulics.

ESWL was first used on kidney stones in 1980. It is also applied to gallstones and pancreatic stones. External shockwaves are focused and pulverize the stone which is located by imaging. The first shockwave lithotriptor approved for human use was the Dornier HM3 (human model 3) derived from a device used for testing aerospace parts. Second generation devices used piezoelectricity or electromagnetism generators. American Urological Association guidelines consider ESWL a potential primary treatment for stones between 4 mm and 2 cm.

Electrohydraulic lithotripsy is an industrial technique for fragmenting rocks by using electrodes to create shockwaves. It was applied to bile duct stones in 1975. It can damage tissue and is mostly used in biliary tract specialty centers. Pneumatic mechanical devices have been used with endoscopes, commonly for large and hard stones.

Laser lithotripsy was introduced in the 1980s. Pulsed dye lasers emit 504 nm (cyan-colored) light that is delivered to the stone by optical fibers through a scope. Holmium:YAG lasers were developed more recently and produce smaller fragments.

References

Digestive system procedures
Urologic procedures